Lake Nona High School is a public high school in Orlando, Florida, United States. It was a relief school for Odyssey Middle School, Cypress Creek High School, and Oak Ridge High. Lake Nona High School stands as one of the more challenging schools in Orange County due to its rigorous academic workload, significantly high AP Enrollment and its open dual enrollment program through Valencia College. In addition to the school's collegiate focus, students have the ability to attend a fast track nursing program, Health Science Academy starting their freshmen year. The School rating has repeatedly received a high 'A' since 2012. Lake Nona also tops most schools in the district with its high graduation rate of 97.7%.

History
Construction began in August 2007 and was completed in June 2009. Its first principal, Dr. A. Robert "Rob" Anderson, was originally principal at Edgewater High.

For its opening year, Nona served grades 6–11. Middle school students moved to their own campus, Lake Nona Middle School, in the 2011–12 school year leaving Lake Nona High School to serve only grades 9–12.

In Spring of 2012 Lake Nona High School allowed Valencia College students to go there while the new Valencia College was being built. The students from Valencia College were there until the new building was fully constructed in August 2012.

Overview
The school's mascot is a Lion and the school colours are navy blue, silver, and white. The  campus includes ten buildings consisting of one and two-story concrete, tilt-wall construction housing administration, classrooms, art and music rooms, kitchen, multi-purpose and dining facility, auditorium, gymnasium, playing fields and outdoor activity areas.

Notable alumni

Demographics
2018-2019 School Year
White Students: 25.8%
Hispanic Students: 56.2%
Black Students: 9.0%
Asian Students: 5.5%
Mixed Race/Other Students: 3.5%
Male Enrollment: 43.9%
Female Enrollment: 56.1%

References

External links
 

High schools in Orange County, Florida
Public middle schools in Florida
Schools in Orlando, Florida
Public high schools in Florida
Orange County Public Schools
Educational institutions established in 2009
2009 establishments in Florida